Proterato is a genus of small sea snails, marine gastropod mollusks in the family Eratoidae, the false cowries or trivias and allies.

Species
Species within the genus Proterato include:
 † Proterato awamoana Schilder, 1933 
 Proterato denticulata (Pritchard & Gatliff, 1901)
 † Proterato dubia (Hutton, 1873) 
 Proterato hindlei (Ladd, 1977)
 Proterato lachryma (Gray, 1832)
 † Proterato neozelanica (Suter, 1917) 
 † Proterato pliocenica C. A. Fleming, 1943 
 Proterato pulcherrima Fehse, 2015
 Proterato renkerorum Fehse, 2015
 † Proterato waiauensis (Laws, 1935) 

Synonymized species  
 Proterato bimaculata (Tate, 1878): synonym of Cypraeerato bimaculata (Tate, 1878)
 Proterato boucheti Drivas & Jay, 1986: synonym of Cypraeerato boucheti (Drivas & Jay, 1986) (original combination)
 Proterato callosa (A. Adams & Reeve, 1850): synonym of Hespererato scabriuscula (Gray, 1832)
 Proterato capensis Schilder, 1933 : synonym of  Eratoena sulcifera  (Gray in Sowerby, 1832)
 Proterato gemma (Bavay, 1917): synonym of Eratoena gemma (Bavay, 1917)
 Proterato geralia C. N. Cate, 1977: synonym of Cypraeerato geralia (C. N. Cate, 1977) (original combination)
 Proterato limata X.-T. Ma, 1994: synonym of Hydroginella limata (Ma, 1994) (original combination)
 Proterato olivaria (Melvill, 1899): synonym of Eratopsis olivaria (Melvill, 1899)
 Proterato pura (Kuroda & Habe, 1971): synonym of Sulcerato pellucida (Reeve, 1865)
 Proterato recondita (Melvill & Standen, 1903): synonym of Sulcerato recondita (Melvill & Standen, 1903)
 Proterato rehderi Raines, 2002: synonym of Hespererato rehderi (Raines, 2002): synonym of Sulcerato rehderi (Raines, 2002) (original combination)
 Proterato sandwichensis (G. B. Sowerby II, 1859): synonym of Eratoena sandwichensis (G. B. Sowerby II, 1859)
 Proterato smithi F. A. Schilder, 1933: synonym of Eratoena smithi (F. A. Schilder, 1933)
 Proterato stalagmia C. N. Cate, 1975: synonym of Cypraeerato stalagmia (C. N. Cate, 1975) (original combination)
 Proterato sulcifera Gray: synonym of Eratoena sulcifera (Gray in Sowerby I, 1832)
 Proterato tomlini Schilder, 1933: synonym of Sulcerato tomlini (Schilder, 1933)

References

External links
 Schilder, F. A. (1927). Revision der Cypraeacea (Moll. Gastr.). Archiv für Naturgeschichte. 91A(10): 1-171

Eratoidae